The Iraqi University (Al Iraqia University) offers bachelor's and graduate university degrees. It is located in the Adhamiyah district of Baghdad, Iraq. It was founded in 1989 and was formerly named the Islamic University. In 2010, the university council recommended that the name be changed to Iraqi University.

The university accepts students from all over the Islamic world. It offers degrees in sciences, humanities, applied medicine, engineering, media and arts, law, education, and other subjects.

Faculties and colleges

Arts Faculty
College of Education
College of Women's Education
Engineering Faculty
Information Faculty
Islamic Sciences Faculty
College of Law
Management and Economics Faculty
Medical Faculty

References

External links 

Universities in Iraq
1989 establishments in Iraq
Islamic universities and colleges